Privlaka is a municipality in Zadar County in Croatia. According to the 2011 census, there are 2,253 inhabitants in the area, 98% of whom are Croats.   

Municipalities of Croatia
Populated coastal places in Croatia
Populated places in Zadar County